King Olaf, King Olav, or similar, may refer to:

Kings of Denmark
 Olof the Brash (9th century), founder of the House of Olaf
 Olaf I of Denmark (–1095), ruled 1086–1095
 Olaf (II) Haraldsen (died ), Danish anti-king who ruled Scania for a few years from 1139
 Olaf II of Denmark, (1370–1387), ruled 1376–1387, also King of Norway as Olaf IV

Kings of Dublin
 Amlaíb Conung, (died ), possibly synonymous with Olaf the White
 Amlaíb mac Gofraid (died 941), ruled 934–941, also King of Northumbria
 Amlaíb Cuarán, (–981), also King of Northumbria

Kings of Mann and the Isles
 Olaf I Godredsson (–1153)
 Olaf the Black (1173/4–1237), ruled 1229–1237

Kings of Norway
 Olaf I of Norway (960s–1000), Olaf Trygvason, ruled 995–1000
 Olaf II of Norway (995–1030), Olaf Haraldson, ruled 1015–1028, canonised
 Olaf III of Norway (–1093), Olaf Kyrre, ruled 1067–1093
 Olaf Magnusson of Norway (1099–1115), ruled 1103–1115
 Olaf IV of Norway (1370–1387), ruled 1380–1387, also King of Denmark as Olaf II
 Olaf V of Norway (1903–1991), ruled 1957–1991

Kings of Sweden
 Olof (I) of Sweden
 Olof (II) Björnsson, ruled 
 Olof Skötkonung (–1022), ruled 995–1022

Other people
 Olaf the White (9th century), Viking sea-king, possibly synonymous with Amlaíb Conung
 Amlaíb Cenncairech, King of Limerick, ruled 932–937
 Amlaíb of Scotland, (died 977), King of Scots
 King Olaf of Camelot, fictional ruler in the television series Merlin; see List of Merlin characters

Other uses
 The Saga of King Olaf, a poem by Henry Wadsworth Longfellow
 Scenes from the Saga of King Olaf, choral work by Edward Elgar based on the Longfellow poem

See also
 Óláfs saga (disambiguation)